Your Biggest Mistake may refer to:

 "Your Biggest Mistake", a song by New Found Glory from the album Catalyst
 "Your Biggest Mistake", a song by Ellie Goulding from the album Lights